Romensky Uyezd was one of the subdivisions of the Poltava Governorate of the Russian Empire. It was situated in the northern part of the governorate. Its administrative centre was Romny.

Demographics
At the time of the Russian Empire Census of 1897, Romensky Uyezd had a population of 186,497. Of these, 93.5% spoke Ukrainian, 4.2% Yiddish, 1.7% Russian, 0.3% German, 0.2% Polish and 0.1% Belarusian as their native language.

References

 
Uezds of Poltava Governorate
Poltava Governorate